Omm Arqal-e Yek (also Romanized as Omm Ārqāl-e Yek) is a village in Hoveyzeh Rural District, in the Central District of Hoveyzeh County, Khuzestan Province, Iran. At the 2006 census, its population was 46, in 6 families.

References 

Populated places in Hoveyzeh County